Beemer is a surname. Notable people with the surname include:

Allen D. Beemer (1842-1909), American sheriff
Blake Beemer (born 1991), African-American baseball coach
Bob Beemer (born 1955), American sound mixer
Bob Beemer (American football) (born 1963), American football player
Brace Beemer (1902-1965), American radio actor and announcer
Bruce Beemer (born 1968), American politician
Brandon Beemer (born 1980), American actor
Horace Jansen Beemer (1845–1912), American/Canadian railway contractor and businessman

See also
 Beamer (surname)